Yang Zhensheng (1890–1956) was a Chinese educator. He was the president of the National University of Qingdao (now a part of Shandong University) from June 1930 to 1932. He was the third president of the university.

1890 births
1956 deaths
Presidents of Shandong University
Chinese male short story writers
20th-century Chinese short story writers
20th-century Chinese male writers
Writers from Yantai
People from Penglai, Shandong
Educators from Shandong
Short story writers from Shandong
National University of Peking alumni